Deo River flows through West Singhbhum in the Indian state of Jharkhand. It receives the Puilgara, a fair-sized mountain stream, from the Santara forest block.

References

Rivers of Jharkhand
Rivers of India